Roberto Lacorte (born 25 June 1968) is an Italian entrepreneur, racing driver, and sailor.

Business ventures
In 2003, Lacorte and brother Andrea founded the Pharmanutra Group, an Italian pharmaceutical company, of which he became vice president and CEO. The company's line of products includes Cetilar, a joint cream which provides title sponsorship to Lacorte's racing endeavors. The brand also provides sponsorship to a number of association football teams in Italy, notably holding primary shirt sponsorship with Parma.

Sport

Motorsports

Lacorte began his racing career in 2011, driving for Spider Racing Team in the Italian Superturismo Championship. The following season, he  returned to the competition with co-driver Giorgio Sernagiotto, finishing third overall. In 2015, Lacorte began his partnership with Villorba Corse, taking part in the 2015 European Le Mans Series in the LMP3 class. By 2017, the partnership had led Lacorte to participate in his first ever 24 Hours of Le Mans, in which he finished seventh in class alongside co-drivers Andrea Belicchi and Giorgio Sernagiotto. The following year, Lacorte launched the Cetilar Academy, a youth karting program designed to advance drivers through the motorsport ladder. Early in 2019, Cetilar Racing stepped up to full-time entrant status for the 2019–20 FIA World Endurance Championship, fielding their Dallara P217 in the LMP2 class. The team would finish 12th in class over the course of the season, tallying 72 points.

Later that year the team formed a partnership with AF Corse, who campaigned Ferrari's factory entries in the GTE Pro class. That alliance paved the way for Cetilar Racing's switch to the GTE Am category for the 2021 season. Alongside Cetilar Racing's GTE Am entry, Cetilar would provide sponsorship for the AF Corse GTE Pro entries for the duration of the season. Lacorte ended his LMP2 program due to his disappointment with the stratification plans that would reduce the horsepower and increase the minimum weight of LMP2 competitors, alongside the lack of competitiveness the Dallara chassis offered compared to the Oreca 07. The team's GTE transition proved immediately fruitful, as they finished on the class podium at Spa before claiming their first class victory in WEC competition at Portimão in June.

Ahead of the 2022 season, Cetilar Racing announced a full-season campaign in the GTD class of the IMSA SportsCar Championship, thereby temporarily ending the team's involvement in the WEC. While the full-season plan wouldn't pan out, the team remained in the series for the entire Michelin Endurance Cup. At the 12 Hours of Sebring, Lacorte and co-drivers Sernagiotto and Antonio Fuoco won the GTD class. For 2023, the team confirmed a return to the championship, taking part with Ferrari's new GT3 offering, the 296 GT3.

Sailing
Lacorte is an avid sailor, competing with his boat SuperNikka, which began development in 2013. In 2015, the boat competed for the first time at the 2015 edition of the 151Miglia, in which it finished second on corrected time. In its maiden year of competition, Lacorte piloted the boat to victory at the Maxi Yacht Rolex Cup, a feat which he repeated in 2017. In 2019, Lacorte was awarded the Italian Owner of the Year award at the FIV Italian Sailor of the Year awards. In December 2020, Lacorte announced his plans to build the first new generation foil Mini Maxi vessel, dubbed FlyingNikka, set to debut in 2022.

As of April 2021, Lacorte serves as an officer of the International Maxi Association, serving as vice president of the Mini Maxi Racer category, the class in which his boat competes.

Racing record

Career summary

* Season still in progress

Complete FIA World Endurance Championship results
(key) (Races in bold indicate pole position; races in italics indicate fastest lap)

Complete WeatherTech SportsCar Championship results
(key) (Races in bold indicate pole position)

Complete 24 Hours of Le Mans results

References

External links
Roberto Lacorte at Bloomberg
Roberto Lacorte at IMSA

1968 births
Living people
Italian racing drivers
Italian male sailors (sport)
24 Hours of Daytona drivers
24 Hours of Le Mans drivers
FIA World Endurance Championship drivers
WeatherTech SportsCar Championship drivers
European Le Mans Series drivers
AF Corse drivers